, also known as The Low Tier Character "TOMOZAKI-kun",  is a Japanese light novel series written by Yūki Yaku and illustrated by Fly. Shogakukan has published ten volumes since May 2016 under their Gagaga Bunko imprint. A manga adaptation with art by Eight Chida was serialized in Square Enix's shōnen manga magazine Monthly Gangan Joker from December 2017 to February 2021. It has been collected in six tankōbon volumes. The light novel is licensed in North America by Yen Press and the English translation is by Winifred Bird. An anime television series adaptation produced by Project No.9 aired from January to March 2021. A second season has been announced.

Plot
Fumiya Tomozaki is a high school student who is on top of the leaderboards of the popular online game Attack Families under the in-game handle "nanashi". A social outcast, he regards Attack Families as a "godly game" that has perfect balance where equal amounts of effort is rewarded with equal amounts of success. In contrast, he considers real life to be a "trash game". One day following a match against the number two player "NO NAME", they agree to meet in person. When they do so, Tomozaki is surprised to find out NO NAME is actually a classmate of his named Aoi Hinami. Taken aback that Tomozaki is nanashi, Hinami decides to help him overcome his issues.

Characters

Tomozaki is a high school student who has been living as a social outcast at school. Due to his success in Attack Families, he often compares both his real life and gaming life. His perspectives begins to change as it is revealed to him that his perfect classmate Aoi Hinami, who all along has been trailing behind him at second place on Attack Families' leaderboards, regards real life as a winnable game and offers to be his walkthrough. He has a younger sister.

Hinami is Tomozaki's classmate who has been regarded as a perfect existence. She essentially excels at everything she does, whether socially, academically or in sports by leading her own class clique, topping the school in grades and excelling at track and field competitions, all while maintaining a likable personality. Behind the scenes, she puts in a terrifying amount of hard work, and is a strong believer of concrete, dedicated effort in order to succeed at everything. Hinami is also an avid fan of Attack Families, where she goes by "NO NAME", and hugely respects "nanashi" who she could not surpass despite her efforts in analyzing his playstyle and perfecting her defense techniques. She later becomes the student council president of their school.

Nicknamed "Mimimi" by her friends and "Minmi" by Tama, she is an energetic, mischievous and popular classmate of Tomozaki who is in the track and field club with Hinami. While maintaining a cheerful demeanor, she has insecurities about herself and her personality that gives in easily to not ruin the mood. Mimimi has been persistent in pestering the lonely Tama into being her friend, and thus eventually established a close friendship with her. Despite her goofy appearance, she also excels at both studies and sports, yet is unable to dethrone Hinami, who perpetually holds first place. She ran against Hinami in the student council election but lost.

Fūka is a reserved and book-loving classmate of Tomozaki who often spends time at the library. She initially took interest in Tomozaki under the misunderstanding that they both share an interest in the same author, whereas Tomozaki only used those books as a cover while doing strategic reviews on Attack Families in the library. Tomozaki comes forward and admits the misunderstanding, and despite that still resolves to try to read and understand the books Fūka loves, as they develop a friendship on it. Hinami initially identifies Fūka as the best prospect for Tomozaki to capture as a girlfriend, and has created multiple situations in order for Tomozaki to confess to clear his goal. She and Tomozaki end up dating.

Nicknamed "Tama" by her friends, she is a blunt and unsociable classmate of Tomozaki. Tama is especially close to Mimimi as Mimimi was the first to try and break through her barriers and befriend her, and they hold each other dear. Her blunt nature often leaves her disliked and, once, got her into trouble as she openly condemned Erika's actions of harassment and bullying, thus making her the target of bullying herself. As she suffers from bullying, Tomozaki, Mizusawa, Takei and Fūka, among others, decided to step in to help her develop social skills. 

Izumi is a social and empathetic classmate of Tomozaki who is a part of Erika's clique. As someone who dislikes conflict, she is often unwilling to stand up to Erika's unreasonable actions. Izumi was Tomozaki's first target to befriend to grow his interpersonal skills as she sits beside him in class. Izumi is in love with Nakamura, and has enlisted Tomozaki's help to teach her how to play Attack Families in order to become Nakamura's practice partner. 

Mizusawa is a popular, gregarious and good-looking classmate of Tomozaki who is a part of Nakamura's clique, as is often considered as the smartest and most level-headed member of the group. He often attracts the attention of girls and is an extremely smooth talker, as he is Tomozaki's role model on the way he speaks. 

Nakamura is a domineering classmate of Tomozaki, who is the de facto leader of his own clique. He is overly competitive and petty when he loses, as shown when he loses to Tomozaki on Attack Families, dismissing his loss as a stroke of bad luck while practicing hard in order to win in a revenge match. He eventually accepts Tomozaki as part of his clique after acknowledging his strengths.

Takei is a cheerful and airheaded classmate of Tomozaki, who is often the mood maker of Nakamura's clique. Considered as the densest member of the clique, he is often excluded from strategic meetings such as when they were planning a camping trip to get Nakamura and Izumi together. He loves to take the center of attention as he often volunteers to take class positions, and often entertains others with his spontaneous acts.

Media

Light novels

Manga
A manga adaptation illustrated by Eight Chida was serialized in Square Enix's Monthly Gangan Joker from December 22, 2017 to February 22, 2021. The manga adaptation is licensed digitally in North America by Comikey.

A spin-off manga series illustrated by Bana Yoshida, titled , began in Shogakukan's Manga One app and Monthly Sunday Gene-X magazine on July 18, 2020. The series focuses on the character Minami Nanami. The spin-off manga is also licensed in English by Yen Press.

Volume list

Bottom-tier Character Tomozaki

Minami Nanami Wants to Shine

Anime
An anime adaptation was announced by Yūki Yaku and Gagaga Bunko on October 11, 2019, which was later confirmed to be a television series on March 21, 2020. The series was animated by Project No.9 and directed by Shinsuke Yanagi, with Fumihiko Shimo handling series composition, and Akane Yano designing the characters. Hiromi Mizutani composed the music.

The series aired from January 8 to March 26, 2021 on AT-X, Tokyo MX, and BS11. The series ran for 12 episodes. An OVA is bundled with the third Blu-ray and DVD volume of the series, which was released on May 7, 2021. Another OVA is bundled with the fourth Blu-ray and DVD volume of the series, which was released on June 2, 2021.

Funimation licensed the series outside of Asia and streamed it on its website in North America and the British Isles, in Europe through Wakanim, and in Australia and New Zealand through AnimeLab. On March 11, 2021, Funimation announced the series would receive an English dub, with the first episode premiering the next day. Following Sony's acquisition of Crunchyroll, the series was moved to Crunchyroll. Children's Playground Entertainment has licensed the series in Southeast Asia, and released it on Aniplus Asia and Bilibili.

On January 14, 2022, it was announced that a new anime project was green-lit. It was later confirmed that the project is a 13-episode second season titled Bottom-Tier Character Tomozaki 2nd Stage.

Reception
The light novel series ranked eighth in 2017, seventh in 2018 and third in 2019 and 2020 in Takarajimasha's annual light novel guide book Kono Light Novel ga Sugoi!, in the bunkobon category.

Notes

References

External links
 
 
 
 

2016 Japanese novels
2021 anime television series debuts
Anime and manga based on light novels
AT-X (TV network) original programming
Crunchyroll anime
Gagaga Bunko
Gangan Comics manga
Light novels
Project No.9
Romantic comedy anime and manga
School life in anime and manga
Shogakukan manga
Seinen manga
Shōnen manga
Upcoming anime television series
Webcomics in print
Yen Press titles